Adams is a common surname of English and Scottish origin, derived from the given name Adam. Related surnames include Addams and McAdam/MacAdam.

People with the surname

Politics and law 
A. A. Adams (1900–1985), American politician
Abigail Adams (1744–1818), second First Lady of the United States and mother of John Quincy Adams, sixth President of the United States
Alma Adams (born 1946), U.S. representative from North Carolina
Barbara Adams (born 1962), Canadian politician
Benjamin F. Adams (1822–1902), American politician
Brock Adams (1927–2004), U.S. representative and U.S. senator from Washington
Bryan Adams (politician) (born 1963), member of the Louisiana House of Representatives from Jefferson Parish
Campbell W. Adams (1852–1930), New York state engineer and surveyor
Charles C. Adams Jr. (born 1947), American international arbitration lawyer, civic activist
Charles Francis Adams Sr. (1807–1886), U.S. congressman, ambassador
Dick Adams (politician) (born 1951), Australian politician
 Dorothy Adams, later known as Dorothy Williams (activist) (1928–2011), South African anti-apartheid activist
Elmer B. Adams (1842–1916), United States District Court judge
Elmer Ellsworth Adams (1861–1950), American newspaper editor and politician
Eric Adams (born 1960), Mayor of New York City (2022–present)
Floyd Adams Jr. (1945–2014), American politician
Fraser L. Adams (1891–1979), mayor of Huntsville, Alabama
Gabriel Adams (1790–1864), mayor of Pittsburgh, Pennsylvania
Gerry Adams (born 1948), Irish republican politician, leader of Sinn Féin 1983–2018
Hank Adams (1943–2020), Native American rights activist
Henry Cullen Adams (1850–1906), U.S. representative from Wisconsin
Irene Adams, Baroness Adams of Craigielea (born 1947), Scottish politician
Isaac Adams (inventor) (1802–1883), American inventor and politician
Isaac Adams (Maine politician) (1773–1834), American politician
Isaac Adams (Wisconsin politician) (1825–1879), American politician
John Donley Adams (born 1973), American lawyer and politician
John Adams (1735–1826), one of the Founding Fathers, first Vice President of the United States and second President of the United States
John Adams (Canadian general) (born 1942), Chief of the Canadian Security Establishment
John Adams (New York politician) (1778–1854), U.S. congressman from New York
John Adams (Virginia politician) (1773–1825), American politician
John Quincy Adams (1767–1848), sixth president of the United States and son of John Adams, second president of the United States
Judith Adams (1943–2012), Australian senator
Jüri Adams (born 1947), Estonian politician
Leo G. Adams (born 1937), American politician
Mumuni Adams (born 1907), Ghanaian politician
Natalie Adams (born 1965), Australian judge
Nigel Adams (born 1966), British politician
Philip Adams (1915–2001), British diplomat
Platt Adams (politician) (1792–1887), New York politician
Robert Adams Jr. (1849–1906), U.S. representative from Pennsylvania
Robert H. Adams (1792–1830), U.S. senator from Mississippi
Salisbury Adams (1925–2004), American lawyer and politician
Samuel Adams (1722–1803), American revolutionary
Samuel Adams (Arkansas politician) (1805–1850), governor of Arkansas
Thomas Adams (politician) (1730–1788), American Continental Congressman
Washington Adams (1814–1883), justice of the Supreme Court of Missouri

Sports 
Alvan Adams (born 1954), American basketball player
Amos Adams (footballer) (1880–1941), English footballer
Andre Adams (born 1975), New Zealand cricketer
Austin Adams (baseball, born 1986), American baseball player
Austin Adams (baseball, born 1991), American baseball player
Babe Adams (1882–1968), American baseball pitcher
Blair Adams (born 1991), English footballer
Bob Adams (1920s pitcher) (1901–1996), American National League baseball pitcher
Bob Adams (1930s pitcher) (1907–1970), American National League baseball pitcher
Bob Adams (American football) (born 1946), US American football player
Bobby Adams (1921–1997), American Major League Baseball infielder
Boyd Adams (born 1934), American racing driver
Bud Adams (1923–2013), owner of American professional football team, Tennessee Titans
Carl Adams (born 1942), American racing driver
Charles Adams (1876–1947), American businessman and Boston Bruins founder
Ché Adams (born 1996), English footballer who plays for Scotland
Chris Adams (cricketer) (born 1970), English cricketer
Chris Adams (footballer) (1927–2012), English footballer
Chris Adams (rugby league) (born 1986), Australian rugby league footballer
Chris Adams (wrestler) (1955–2001), English judoka and professional wrestler
Chuck Adams (born 1971), American tennis player
Danesha Adams (born 1986), American footballer (soccer)
Danielle Adams (born 1989), American basketball player
Darren Adams (born 1974), English footballer
Davante Adams (born 1992), American football player
Davey Adams (1883–1948), Scottish footballer
Dennis Adams (1934–1971), South African boxer of the 1950s and 1960s
Derek Adams (born 1975), Scottish footballer and manager
Diane Adams, Canadian curler, World champion
Doc Adams (1814–1899), American baseball player and executive, credited with inventing the shortstop position
Don Adams (basketball) (1947–2013), American basketball player
Eddie Adams, American racing driver
Emery Adams (1911–1960), American baseball player
Gaines Adams (1983–2010), American football player
Gary Adams (baseball) (born 1939), American college baseball coach
Georgia Adams (born 1993), English women's cricketer
Harry Adams (baseball umpire) (1863–1941), American Major League Baseball umpire
Hassan Adams (born 1984), American basketball player
Jack Adams (1894–1968), National Hockey League player, coach, and manager
Jalen Adams (born 1995), American basketball player for Hapoel Jerusalem in the Israeli Basketball Premier League
Jamal Adams (born 1995), American football player
Jamie Adams (born 1987), Scottish footballer
Jen Adams (born 1980), Australian lacrosse coach and former player
Jimmy Adams (racing driver) (born 1972), US racecar driver
Jordan Adams (born 1994), American basketball player
Josh Adams (American football) (born 1996), American football player
Junior Adams (born 1979), American football coach
Katrina Adams (born 1968), American professional tennis player
Keion Adams (born 1995), American football player
Kevyn Adams (born 1974), American ice hockey player
Marcus Adams (footballer) (born 1993), Australian rules footballer
Martin Adams (born 1956), English darts player, 2007 British Darts Organisation World Champion
Matt Adams (born 1988), American baseball player
Matthew Adams (American football) (born 1995), American football player
Michael Adams (basketball) (born 1963), American NBA basketball player, college basketball
Michael Adams (chess player) (born 1971), English chess grandmaster
Micky Adams (born 1961), English football (soccer) manager
Mike Adams (born 1974), professional American football player
Montravius Adams (born 1995), American football player
Myles Adams (born 1998), American football player
Neil Adams (born 1958), British judoka
Neil Adams (born 1965), English football (soccer) player
Nick Adams (born 1948), British racing driver
Nicola Adams (born 1982), English boxer
Ondigui Adams (born 1987), Cameroonian football (soccer) player
Philippe Adams (born 1969), Belgian Formula One driver
Phillip Adams (American football) (1988–2021), American football player
Rex Adams (1928–2014), English footballer
Riley Adams (born 1996), American baseball player
Rodney Adams (born 1994), American football player
Ronnie Adams (1916–2004), British rally driver
Roosevelt Adams (born 1994), Filipino-American basketball player
Russ Adams (born 1980), American baseball player with the Toronto Blue Jays
Sadick Adams (born 1990), Ghanaian footballer
Sam Adams (born 1973), US American football player
Sam Adams Sr. (1948–2015), US American football player
Shawn Adams (born 1974), Canadian curler
Sidney Adams (1904–1945), English cricketer
Spencer Adams (1898–1970), American Baseball player
Stephen Adams (born 1989), Ghanaian football player
Steven Adams (born 1993), New Zealand basketball player; half-brother of Valerie Adams (below)
Stewart Adams (ice hockey) (1904–1978), Canadian ice hockey player
Taeyanna Adams, Micronesian swimmer
Tony Adams (born 1966), English footballer and manager
Trey Adams (born 1997), American football player
Tyler Adams (born 1999), American soccer player
Valerie Adams (born 1984), New Zealand shot putter
Vicki Adams (born 1989), Scottish curler
Vicki Adams (trick rider) (born 1951), rodeo performer
W. Adams, English football manager of Shrewsbury Town Football Club between 1905 and 1912

Literature and journalism 
Bristow Adams (1875–1957), American journalist, forester, professor, illustrator
Brooks Adams (1848–1927), American historian and a critic of capitalism
Carol J. Adams (born 1951), American writer, feminist, and animal rights advocate
Cecil Adams, pseudonym of author(s) of a syndicated question-and-answer column, The Straight Dope
Douglas Adams (1952–2001), British comic radio dramatist and writer, author of The Hitchhiker's Guide to the Galaxy series
Eddie Adams (1933–2004), American photojournalist
Francis Adams (writer) (1862–1893), Australian essayist, poet, dramatist, novelist and journalist
Franklin P. Adams (1881–1960), American columnist (under the pen name F.P.A.), writer, and wit
Hannah Adams (1755–1831), American historian and theologian
Harriet Adams (1892–1982), American novelist and publisher
Henry Adams (1838–1918), American historian, journalist, and novelist
Kay Adams (sportscaster) (born 1986), American sportscaster and television personality
Lois Bryan Adams (1817–1870), American writer, journalist, newspaper editor
Mary Hall Barrett Adams (1816–1860), American editor, letter writer
Mary Mathews Adams (1840–1902), American writer, philanthropist
Phillip Adams (born 1939), Australian broadcaster, columnist
Poppy Adams, British television director/producer and novelist
R. J. Q. Adams (born 1943), American historian and professor
Richard Adams (1920–2016), British novelist, author of Watership Down and The Plague Dogs
Roy Adams (born 1940), Canadian author, newspaper columnist, human rights activist, and academic
Samuel Hopkins Adams (1871–1958), American journalist and short story writer
Sarah Fuller Flower Adams (1805–1848), English poet, hymn writer

Music 
Ben Adams (born 1981), British singer, businessman
Bryan Adams (born 1959), Canadian singer, guitarist, and songwriter
Charlie Adams (drummer) (born 1954), American musician
Dave Adams (1938–2016), English musician and songwriter
Derroll Adams (1925–2000), American folk musician
India Adams (1927–2020), American singer
Jim Adams (musician) (born 1967), American, songwriter, heavy-metal guitarist with the band Defiance
John Adams (composer) (born 1947), American minimalist composer
John Luther Adams (born 1953), American composer
Louise Adams (born 1983), Australian musician
Oleta Adams (born 1962), American soul and jazz singer
Pepper Adams (1930–1986), American jazz saxophonist and composer
Pierrette Adams (born 1962), singer from the Republic of the Congo
Ryan Adams (born 1974), American alternative-country and rock and roll singer/songwriter
Ryan Adams (born 1993), American rapper
Suzanne Adams (1872–1953), American operatic soprano
 Victoria Adams (born 1974), birth name of British pop singer Victoria Beckham, known as "Posh Spice"
 William James Adams Jr. (born 1975), birth name of will.i.am, American rapper, singer, songwriter and record producer
Yolanda Adams (born 1961), American gospel singer

Art and photography 
Ansel Adams (1902–1984), American photographer
Arthur Adams (comics) (born 1963), American comic book artist
Clinton Adams (1918–2002), American painter and lithographer
Elinor Proby Adams (1885–1945), English painter
Gina Adams (born 1965), Ojibwe-American cross-media artist and activist
Harriet Isabel Adams (1863–1952), British artist and scientific illustrator
Herbert Adams (sculptor) (1858–1945), American sculptor
J. Ottis Adams (1851–1927), American Impressionist painter
JJ Adams (born 1978), British mixed media artist
Mark Adams (artist) (1925–2006), American artist
Mark Adams (photographer) (born 1949), New Zealand photographer
Neal Adams (1941–2022), American comic book artist
Robert Adams (photographer) (born 1937), American photographer
Scott Adams (born 1957), cartoonist and creator of the Dilbert comic strip
Theo Adams (born 1989), British performance artist
Tracey Adams (born 1954), American expressionist painter
Wayman Elbridge Adams (1883–1959), American portrait painter

Dance 
Precious Adams, American ballet dancer

Drama and television 
Abel Adams (1879–1938), Finnish film producer
Amy Adams (born 1974), American actress
Beverly Adams (born 1945), Canadian-born actress
Brian Adams (wrestler) (1964–2007), American professional wrestler
Brooke Adams (born 1949), American actress
Carol Adams (1918–2012), American actress
Cecily Adams (1958–2004), American actress, daughter of Don Adams
Chris Adams (1955–2001), English model and professional wrestler
CJ Adams (born 2000), American actor
Don Adams (1923–2005), American actor, comedian and director
Edie Adams (1927–2008), American comedienne, actress, singer and businesswoman
Fran Adams, American actress
Jane Adams (born 1965), American actress
Joey Adams (1911–1999), American author and comedian
Joey Adams (born 1968), American actress
Julie Adams (1926–2019), American actress
Kathryn Adams (1893–1959), American silent film actress
Kelly Adams (born 1979), English actress
Mary Kay Adams (born 1962), American actress
Maud Adams (born 1945), Swedish model and actress
Maude Adams (1872–1953), American stage actress
Nick Adams (1931–1968), American actor and screenwriter
Patrick J. Adams (born 1981), Canadian actor
Ryland Adams (born 1991), American YouTuber
Stanley Adams (1915–1977), American actor and film writer
Stella Adams (1883–1961), American actress
Toni Adams (1964–2010), American professional female wrestler
Tony Adams (born 1940), Welsh actor
Trudy Adams, American actress and professional wrestler

Models 
Stephanie Adams (1970–2018), American Playboy model and author

Military 
Charles Francis Adams Jr. (1835–1915), Civil War General and president of the Union Pacific Railroad
Charles Francis Adams III (1866–1954), U.S. Navy secretary
Donald E. Adams (1921–1952), American pilot and Korean War flying ace
James Frank Adams (1844–1922), Civil War Medal of Honor recipient
John G. B. Adams (1841–1900), Civil War Officer and Medal of Honor recipient
Robert Bellew Adams (1856–1928), Scottish recipient of the Victoria Cross
Samuel Adams (naval officer) (1912–1942), U.S. Navy officer

Science, medicine, and engineering 
Amanda Adams (born 1976), American author and archaeologist
Arthur Adams (1820–1878), British physician and naturalist
Charles Hitchcock Adams (1868–1951), U.S. astronomer
Clarence Raymond Adams (1898–1965), American mathematician
Douglas Q. Adams, American linguist
Edward Dean Adams (1846–1931), American engineer, financier, and scientist, Niagara Falls hydroelectric dam engineer, recipient of the 1926 John Fritz Medal
Edwin Plimpton Adams (1878–1956), American physicist
Francis Adams (1796–1861), Scottish medical doctor and translator of Greek medical works
Henry Adams (1858–1929), American architectural engineer
Henry Percy Adams (1865–1930), English architect
Johann Friedrich Adam (1780–1838), Russian botanist known by the author abbreviation "Adams"
John Bodkin Adams (1899–1983), Irish-British physician and suspected serial killer
John Couch Adams (1819–1892), British mathematician and astronomer
Karl Adams (mathematician) (1811–1849), Swiss mathematician and teacher
Matthew Algernon Adams (1836–1913), British medical doctor and chemist
Michael J. Adams (1930–1967), American aviator and NASA astronaut
Otto Eugene Adams (1889–1968), American architect
Patch Adams (born 1945), American physician, social activist and clown
Raymond Delacy Adams (1911–2008), American neurologist
Robert Adams (1540–1595), British architect and surveyor
Robert Adams (1809–1870), British firearms designer
Robert McCormick Adams Jr. (1926–2018), U.S. anthropologist
Roger Adams (1889–1971), American organic chemist
Stewart Adams (chemist) (1923–2019), British chemist
Thomas Adams (1871–1940), Scottish architect and urban planner
Walter Sydney Adams (1876–1956), US astronomer
William Adams (locomotive engineer) (1823–1904), British locomotive engineer
William Adams (oculist) (1783–1827), British ophthalmic surgeon
William Bridges Adams (1797–1872), British author, inventor, and locomotive engineer

Other 
Adams baronets, a 17th and 18th century English baronetcy
Charles Francis Adams IV (1910–1999), American: president of Raytheon Company
Charles Kendall Adams (1835–1902), American educator and historian
Charlotte Adams (1859–?), Australian, first European woman to climb to the peak of Mount Kosciuszko
Clifford Adams, computer programmer
Eliphalet Adams (1677–1753), American Puritan minister
Herbert Baxter Adams (1850–1901), American educator and historian
Jane Kelley Adams (1852–1924), American educator
John Adams (mutineer) (1766–1829), last survivor of the Bounty mutineers who settled on Pitcairn Island
Kevin Adams (born 1962), American theatrical lighting designer
Marcel Adams (1920–2020), Canadian real estate investor, billionaire, and Holocaust survivor
Margaret Adams (pilot), Australian pilot
Richard Adams (businessman) (born 1946), British fair trade organisation founder
Richard Adams (religious writer) (c. 1626–1698), non-conforming English Presbyterian divine
Robert Merrihew Adams (born 1937), American philosopher
Samuel Adams, American beer company
Scott Adams (game designer) (born 1952), American computer game designer and programmer
Thomas William Adams (1842–1919), New Zealand forestry pioneer
Trudie Adams (born 1959), American woman who has been missing since 1978
Weaver W. Adams (1901–1963), American chess player
William Adams (pilot) (1564–1620), English navigator and first Briton to reach Japan
William Adams (Master of Pembroke) (1706–1789), English Master of Pembroke College, Oxford
Zabdiel Adams (1739–1801), American minister and writer, cousin of President John Adams

Disambiguation lists 

Andrew Adams
Arthur Adams
Bert Adams
Brian Adams
Charles Adams
Charles Francis Adams
Chris Adams
Colin Adams
Craig Adams
Daniel Adams
David Adams
Don Adams
Douglas Adams
Edward Adams
Francis Adams
Frank Adams
George Adams
Greg Adams
Henry Adams
Herbert Adams
James Adams
Jimmy Adams
John Adams
Joseph Adams
Keith Adams
Lee Adams
Mark Adams
Matthew Adams
Michael Adams
Mike Adams
Neil Adams
Nick Adams
Patrick Adams
Paul Adams
Richard Adams
Rick Adams
Robert Adams
Roger Adams
Samuel Adams
Scott Adams
Stanley Adams
Stephen Adams
Steve Adams
Terry Adams
Thomas Adams
Tom Adams
Tony Adams
Walter Adams
William Adams

See also 
Adams (disambiguation)
Adams (taxonomic authority)
Adams political family
Addams (disambiguation)

References 

Patronymic surnames
English-language surnames
Surnames of English origin
Surnames from given names